Ubirajara is one of the indigenous novels by José de Alencar. It was first published in 1874. This name means lord of spear or lancer in English, from  - spear, e  - lord; it accorded José de Alencar.

Ubirajara (the companion to Iracema) A Legend Of The Tupy Indians by Jose De Alencar was translated from the Portuguese into English verse by J.T.W. Sadler, M.A. early 20th century.
Published by Ronald Massey, 108, Victoria Street, S.W. 1.

External links

1874 Brazilian novels
Novels by José de Alencar
Brazilian novels
Portuguese-language novels